This is a list of hospitals in the Houston area sorted by name. There are more than 80 hospitals in Harris County and more than 125 in the Greater Houston area.

 Baylor St. Luke's Medical Center
 Ben Taub Hospital
Clear Lake Regional Medical Center
 Cypress Fairbanks Medical Center
 HCA Houston Healthcare 
Houston Methodist Baytown Hospital
Houston Methodist Clear Lake Hospital
Houston Methodist Continuing Care Hospital
Houston Methodist Hospital
 Houston Methodist Sugar Land Hospital
Houston Methodist The Woodlands Hospital
 Houston Methodist West Hospital
Houston Methodist Willowbrook Hospital
 Intracare Hospital North
Lyndon B. Johnson General Hospital
 Memorial Hermann–Texas Medical Center 
Memorial Hermann Katy Hospital 
Memorial Hermann Memorial City Medical Center 
Memorial Hermann Northwest Hospital 
Menninger Clinic 
St. Joseph Medical Center 
Texas Children's Hospital 
 Texas Orthopedic Hospital
The Woman's Hospital of Texas 
TIRR Memorial Hermann 
University of Texas M.D. Anderson Cancer Center 
 West Houston Medical Center
 Westbury Community Hospital

References 

Texas, Houston

Hospitals
Hospitals in Houston
Houston